The Okiek, sometimes called the Ogiek or Akiek (although the term Akiek sometimes refers to a distinct subgroup), are a Southern Nilotic ethnic group native to Tanzania and Southern Kenya (in the Mau Forest), and Western Kenya (in the Mount Elgon Forest). In 2019 the ethnic Okiek population was 52,596, although the number of those speaking the Akiek language was as low as 500.

History
In 1903, C.W.Hobley recorded eleven Okiek communities, a hunter-gatherer society, living in western Kenya. He noted that a number of entire sections were bi-lingual, speaking either Maasai, Kipsigis or Nandi in addition to their own languages.

Hunter-gatherer communities also lived on the eastern highlands of Kenya where they were known in local traditions by the names "Gumba" and "Athi".

Language
Many Ogiek speakers have shifted to the languages of surrounding peoples: the Akiek in northern Tanzania now speak Maasai and the Akiek of Kinare, Kenya now speak Gikuyu. The Ogiek are one of various groups of hunter-gatherers in Kenya and Tanzania to which the term Dorobo or Ndorobo (a term of Maasai origin now considered derogatory) has been applied.

Land disputes
The Ogiek have made numerous claims against the government of Kenya alleging unfair treatment, especially that they have been illegally dispossessed of their land.
Timsales Ltd is active in deforestation in its area for long. It is partly owned by relatives of former presidents Kenyatta and Moi.

On June 23, 2022, the African Court on Human and Peoples' Rights ruled that the Kenyan government must pay the Okiek 157,850,000 shillings for decades of material and moral damages, recognize their indigeneity and help get them official titles to their ancestral lands.

Notes

References
 Blackburn, Roderic H. (1970, revised 2011) "A Preliminary Report of Research among the Ogiek Tribe of Kenya.” Discussion paper No. 89, University College Nairobi. pp. 1-10
 Blackburn, Roderic H. (1971) “The Honey Complex in Okiek Society, Culture and Personality.”  Ph.D dissertation, Department of Anthropology, Michigan State University. University of Michigan Microfilm Offprint.
 Blackburn, Roderic H. (1973) "Okiek Ceramics: Evidence for Central Kenya Prehistory," in “Azania, Journal of the British Institute in Eastern Africa.” pp.  55–70.
 Blackburn, Roderic H. (1974)"The Okiek and Their History" in “Azania, Journal of the British Institute in Eastern Africa.” pp.  139–157.
 Blackburn, Roderic H. (1976)"Okiek History" Revised and expanded edition of (1974, above)  in “Kenya Before 1900, Eight Regional Studies,” (B.A.Ogot, ed), East African Publishing House, Nairobi. pp.  53-83
 Blackburn, Roderic H. (1982) “Okiek, (Kenya's People series),” Evans Brothers Limited,           London. pp.  1-42.
 Blackburn, Roderic H. (1982) "In the Land of Milk and Honey, Okiek adaptations to their forest and neighbors," in “Politics and History in Band Societies,”  E. Leacock and R. Lee, editors. Cambridge University Press. pp.  283-306
 Blackburn, Roderic H. (1985) "Okiek Resource Tenure and Territoriality as Mechanisms for Social Control and Allocation of Resources,” in “Sprache und Geschichte in Afrika” (Proceedings of the International Conference: African Hunter-Gatherers. Cologne January 1985),  SUGIA, Band 7.1 pp.  61–82. 
 Blackburn, Roderic H. (1992)” Human Uses of the Ol Pusimoru/ Maasai Mau Forest.” Forest Department & National Resources Institute (UK). pp. 1-71.  
 Blackburn, Roderic H. (1993) "Okiek of Kenya", in “State of the Peoples, A Global Human Rights Report on Societies in Danger.” Published for Cultural Survival by Beacon Press, Boston.  
 Blackburn, Roderic H. (1996) "Fission, Fusion and Foragers in East Africa: Macro and micro  analysis of the processes of  diversity and integration", in “Cultural Diversity Among Twentieth-Century Foragers: An African Perspective.” Susan Kent, editor. Cambridge University Press. pp. 188-212.
 Heine, Bernd (1973) 'Vokabulare ostafrikanischer Restsprachen', Afrika und Übersee, 57, 1, pp. 38–49.
 Kratz, Corinne A. (1981) "Are the Okiek really Masai? or Kipsigis? or Kikuyu?"  Cahiers d'Études africaines.  Vol. 79 XX:3, pp. 355–68.
 Kratz, Corinne A. (1986) 'Ethnic interaction, economic diversification and language use: a report on research with Kaplelach and Kipchornwonek Okiek', Sprache und Geschichte in Afrika, 7, 189—226.
 Kratz, Corinne A. (1989) "Okiek Potters and their Wares." In Kenyan Pots and Potters.  Edited by J. Barbour and S. Wandibba.  Nairobi: Oxford University Press.
 Kratz, Corinne A. (1994) Affecting Performance: Meaning, Movement and Experience in Okiek Women's Initiation. Washington DC: Smithsonian Institution Press.
 Kratz, Corinne A. (1999) "Okiek of Kenya." In Foraging Peoples: An Encyclopedia of Contemporary  Hunter-Gatherers.  Edited by Richard Lee and Richard Daly.  Cambridge: Cambridge University Press, pp. 220–224.
 Kratz, Corinne A. (2000)"Gender, Ethnicity, and Social Aesthetics in Maasai and Okiek Beadwork."  In Rethinking Pastoralism in Africa: Gender, Culture, and the Myth of the Patriarchal Pastoralist.  Edited by Dorothy Hodgson. Oxford: James Currey Publisher, pp. 43–71.
 Kratz, Corinne A. (2001) "Conversations and Lives."  In African Words, African Voices: Critical Practices in Oral History. Edited by Luise White, Stephan Miescher, and David William Cohen. Bloomington: Indiana University Press, pp. 127–161.
 Kratz, Corinne A. (2002) The Ones That Are Wanted: Communication and the Politics of Representation in a Photographic Exhibition. Berkeley: University of California Press.
 Kratz, Corinne A. (2009) "Communicative Resonance across Settings: Marriage Arrangement, Initiation and Political Meetings in Kenya.” In Ritual Communication. Edited by Ellen Basso and Gunter Senft. Oxford: Berg Publishers.
 Kratz, Corinne A. (2010) Affecting Performance: Meaning, Movement and Experience in Okiek Women's Initiation. Tucson: Wheatmark (reissue of 1994 book).
 Kratz, Corinne A. (2012)"Ceremonies, Sitting Rooms, and Albums: How Okiek Displayed Photographs in the 1990s." In Photography in Africa: Ethnographic Perspectives. Edited by Richard Vokes. Oxford: James Currey, pp. 241–265.
 Rottland, Franz (1982) Die Südnilotischen Sprachen: Beschreibung, Vergelichung und Rekonstruktion (Kölner Beiträge zur Afrikanistik vol. 7). Berlin: Dietrich Reimer. (esp. pp. 26, 138-139)

External links
 The Ogiek People
 Struggles of the Ogiek people of Kenya (YouTube video)

Ethnic groups in Tanzania
Ethnic groups in Kenya
Hunter-gatherers of Africa
Dorobo